Little Alexander is a 1981 Soviet drama film directed by Vladimir Fokin.

Plot 
The film takes place in May 1945. Soviet soldiers save children in Blankenheim from the Werewolf attack, organize an orphanage in which begins the story of a boy who was abandoned by refugees. Russians called him Little Alexander.

Cast 
 Boris Tokarev
 Yuriy Nazarov
 Mikhail Kokshenov as Soldat Kurykin (as Michail Kokschenow)
 Olaf Schneider
 Ute Lubosch
 Gerry Wolff as Hübner
 Walfriede Schmitt as Friedel
 Nikolai Skorobogatov as Russanow
 Olaf Boddeutsch as Peter
 Jana Lenz as Irmgard

References

External links 
 

1981 films
1980s Russian-language films
Soviet drama films
1981 drama films